Days Awake is an American rock band from Asbury Park, New Jersey.  Collectively they were the recipients of eleven Asbury Music Awards.

Original Music

*Someday Somewhere

*Thanks But No Thanks (EP)

*My Life (EP)
*Day After Day (EP)
*Get Up Get Out (EP)
*Livin' a Lie (EP)
*Devil In Disguise (2006 demo)
*Livin' It Up (2006 demo)
*Scream Out Loud (2006 demo)
*Stand Up (2006)
*U4U (I'd Like to Thank You)
*Needs
*Would You Care
*Understand
*Padlock Box
*So Smooth
*Right Track
*Let's Get Together

History

Days Awake appeared at The Saint in Asbury Park for two well attended reunion shows on 4 November 2008 and 6 April 2009. Days Awake also reunited for a night on stage at the House Of Independents on 30 September 2016. The 13 song setlist brought the band out of retirement after nearly 7.5 years.

Lollapalooza's Last Band Standing

In Summer of 2006, Days Awake was selected among hundreds of amateur bands by Perry Farrell as one of America's best 20 live performers.  However, the band withdrew honorably from the contest in the final week of preliminary voting, citing apparent unfair voting practices via internet bots as being contrary to the spirit of the contest.

The Rick Barry Era

From November 2006 through April 2007, core members of the Days Awake band performed a number of special appearances in Asbury Park and New York City together with lead vocalist Rick Barry.

Days Awake and Lance Larson: Building a Bridge

Members of Days Awake performed multiple shows with Lance Larson in 2006 and 2007. They were involved in the recording of his album, Song for a Soldier, which was released in 2007.

Lineup

 Chuck Schoonmaker -   - lead vocals, guitar, keyboards
 Jay Cagna - bass guitar
 Sarah Tomek - drums, percussion, backing vocals
 Jeremy Korpas - lead guitar, backing vocals
 Eric Safka - keyboards
 Dominic Lacquaniti - rhythm guitar, backing vocals, Lead Vocals on "Alright now"

Auxiliary members
 Rick Barry (musician) - (2006–2007) - lead vocals, guitar
 Lance Larson (musician) - vocals, guitar
 Dave Ferraro - (2006) - bass
 Darren Lambeth - saxophone
 James Dalton (musician) - harmonica, mouth harp
 G2

Official music videos
 "Day After Day"

External links
Days Awake on MySpace

References
Days Awake NYC review

Rock music groups from New Jersey
Musical groups established in 2004
Asbury Park, New Jersey